Laura Dianne Vandervoort (born September 22, 1984) is a Canadian actress. She is best known for her roles as Sadie Harrison in the CTV teen drama series Instant Star, Arla "The Bolt-Gun Killer" Cogan in the Syfy supernatural drama series Haven, Kara Zor-El (Supergirl) in The CW serial drama series Smallville, and as Lisa in the ABC science fiction series V (2009). In 2014, she starred in the Space channel drama series Bitten, a television adaptation of Kelley Armstrong's book series Women of the Otherworld as Elena Michaels.

Early life
Vandervoort was born and raised in Toronto, Ontario. She is the daughter of a Canadian mother and a Dutch father. In the first weeks of her life, she contracted meningitis, resulting in a severe sickness that lasted a few months. Her parents were initially told she was not going to survive. Growing up, Vandervoort was involved in several sports such as football, karate (where she is a second-degree black belt), basketball, tennis, gymnastics and baseball. She has a sister named Sarah and she is related to Canadian actor Gordon Pinsent.

Career 
In 1997, she made her acting debut at age 13. After taking several classes and doing background work on Canadian shows such as Road to Avonlea and Harriet the Spy, she got her first speaking role in the Canadian children's horror anthology series Goosebumps and Are You Afraid of the Dark?, both series were aired on YTV.

After commercials and guest starring roles in Mutant X, Prom Queen: The Marc Hall Story, Goosebumps, Twice in a Lifetime, Doc, Sue Thomas: F.B.Eye, Troubled Waters, The Dresden Files, and a few Disney Channel original films (Mom's Got a Date with a Vampire and Alley Cats Strike), at age 19, while attending York University where she studied Psychology and English, Vandervoort landed a lead role as Sadie Harrison in the CTV teen drama series Instant Star, which ran for four seasons.

In 2006, Vandervoort starred in her first feature film titled The Lookout alongside Jeff Daniels, Joseph Gordon-Levitt, Matthew Goode, and Isla Fisher. Several other television appearances such as CSI: Crime Scene Investigation led Vandervoort to the role of Clark Kent's Kryptonian cousin "Kara Kent" (the woman destined to become Supergirl) in The CW serial drama series Smallville. She was a regular in season seven, and appeared in the "Bloodline" episode for season eight. She then returned for another two episodes in the tenth and final season of Smallville.

Following The CW and Smallville, Vandervoort then shot the sequel to the feature film Into the Blue titled Into the Blue 2: The Reef. She next filmed an independent production titled The Jazzman, which also starred Canadian stars Michael Ironside (who appeared in the second V miniseries as well as the 1984 V regular series) and Corey Sevier.

Vandervoort portrayed "Lisa", an extraterrestrial Visitor, in the 2009 ABC science fiction series V, a reboot of the 1980s science fiction franchise of the same name.

In 2010, Vandervoort appeared in the two-part miniseries Riverworld in which she plays Jessie Machalan, the fiancée of war correspondent Matt Ellman who wakes up after death on a planet populated by everyone who has ever lived on Earth. In 2011, she starred in the suspense film The Entitled, alongside Ray Liotta and Kevin Zegers.

In October 2011, she posed for PETA as part of the "Exotic Skins" campaign and in 2014, she appeared nude again for an ad that protested against the keeping of marine mammals in captivity. In 2012, she had a small role in Seth MacFarlane's comedy film Ted, playing Mark Wahlberg's coworker Tanya.

In 2014, she appeared in the TV adaptation of the Kelley Armstrong novel Bitten, which premiered on January 13, 2014.

In 2016, Vandervoort appeared as the supervillain Indigo/Brainiac 8 in three episodes of season one of the CBS action-adventure series Supergirl.

In 2019, Vandervoort appeared in the Netflix adaptation of the Jonathan Maberry book series V Wars alongside Ian Somerhalder, Adrian Holmes, and Peter Outerbridge, premiered on December 5, 2019.

Personal life
Vandervoort resides in Toronto, Ontario.

Filmography

Film

Television

Video games

Music videos

Awards and nominations

References

External links

 
 
 Laura Vandervoort on WhoSay

1984 births
Living people
20th-century Canadian actresses
21st-century Canadian actresses
Actresses from Toronto
Canadian child actresses
Canadian expatriate actresses in the United States
Canadian film actresses
Canadian people of Dutch descent
Canadian stage actresses
Canadian television actresses
Canadian video game actresses
Canadian voice actresses